The 2019 World Beach Wrestling Championships was held in Zagreb, Croatia from 7 to 8 September 2019.

Medal table

Results

Men

Women

References 

Wrestling competitions
International wrestling competitions hosted by Croatia
Amateur wrestling
2019 in sport wrestling
2019 in Croatian sport